Indosaurus is a genus of carnivorous theropod dinosaur that lived in what is now India, about 69 to 66 million years ago during the Maastrichtian division of the Late Cretaceous. The species I. matleyi weighed roughly 700 kg (1540 lb).

History 
The type species, Indosaurus matleyi, was named by Huene and Matley in 1933 making Indosaurus the first Majungasaurine to be discovered. The generic name refers to India and the specific name honours Matley. This species now also includes Megalosaurus matleyi; confusingly, the dubious tooth taxon Orthogoniosaurus shares the same specific name but is based on different material. Some paleontologists have speculated that Indosuchus and Compsosuchus should also be included within the genus Indosaurus.

Originally assigned by Huene to the Allosauridae, Indosaurus is today considered a member of the Abelisauridae family.

Description 
The parietal of the frontal-parietal region is broad whereas the lower surface of the frontal is wide, the transverse crest lies above and behind the orbit. The frontals are concave and decline in to the front of the cranium. The supratemporal fossa is short and broad as in Antrodemus.

Fossil Evidence 
The fossil evidence from Jabalpur, India, includes the now-lost  holotype GSI K27/565, a partial skull of unusual thickness found by Charles Alfred Matley in the Lameta Formation; other parts of the skeleton have later been referred to it. The cranium suggests that Indosaurus may have had horns above its eyes, although all the fossil evidence has since been lost. Indosaurus may have been related to the unusual Madagascan dinosaur Majungasaurus.

See also

 Timeline of ceratosaur research

References

Majungasaurines
Late Cretaceous dinosaurs
Dinosaurs of India and Madagascar
Fossil taxa described in 1933
Taxa named by Charles Alfred Matley
Taxa named by Friedrich von Huene